The Villaverdists, also known as the Villaverdist Conservatives (V), were a regenerationist political faction within the Liberal Conservative Party (PLC), led by Prime Minister of Spain Raimundo Fernández-Villaverde. The faction contested the September 1905 general election on its own, despite the death of Fernández-Villaverde in July. It disbanded shortly thereafter.

References

Conservative Party (Spain)
Defunct political parties in Spain
Political parties established in 1905
Political parties disestablished in 1905
1905 establishments in Spain
1905 disestablishments in Spain
Restoration (Spain)